Kuwait participated at the 2018 Asian Para Games which was held in Jakarta, Indonesia from 6 to 13 October 2018. The Kuwaiti delegation was composed of 23 athletes who competed in four sports, namely: table tennis, fencing, shooting para sports, and para athletics. Secretary of Kuwait Disabled Club Saad Al-Azmaa was the head of the delegation.

Medalists

Medals by sport

Medals by day

See also 
 Kuwait at the 2018 Asian Games

References

2018 in Kuwaiti sport
Nations at the 2018 Asian Para Games
Kuwait at the Asian Para Games